Julian Cash (born 29 August 1996) is a British tennis player.

He has a career high ATP doubles ranking of 65 achieved on 9 January 2023. He also has a career high singles ranking of 786 achieved on 1 August 2022.

Cash has won ten ATP Challenger doubles titles, all in 2022 with Henry Patten. They hold the record for most ATP Challenger doubles titles in a single season.

Personal
Born in Brighton, Cash grew up in Burgess Hill and attended Bede’s Senior School in Eastbourne. He began playing tennis as a 7 year old. 

As a junior he reached a highest ranking of 68 in the world and participated in the boys' singles at the 2013 Wimbledon Championships, where he lost in the second round to Alexander Zverev. His favourite player growing up was Jo-Wilfried Tsonga.

College career 
Cash played college tennis at Mississippi State University but transferred to Oklahoma State University following his freshman year. He reached number 1 in the NCAA doubles rankings and number 18 in singles.

Doubles performance timeline

Current through the 2023 Australian Open.

ATP Challenger and ITF Futures finals

Singles: 2 (0–2)

Doubles: 32 (24 titles, 8 runner-ups)

References

External links
 
 

1996 births
Living people
British male tennis players
Sportspeople from Brighton
Mississippi State Bulldogs tennis players
Oklahoma State Cowboys tennis players
English male tennis players